The Johann Adolph Hasse Museum is a museum in the Composers Quarter in Hamburg-Neustadt, Germany.

The museum is dedicated to the life and work of the opera composer Johann Adolph Hasse. The presentation starts with his childhood and youth, Hasse being a descendant of church musicians from Hamburg-Bergedorf. He obtained his first music lessons from his father.

The presentation continues with his career as a prominent composer. He and his wife, the opera singer Faustina Bordoni, gained international prestige and played respected roles at the European courts and theaters.

The collection consists of text books of his operas (libretti), historical prints of musical compositions, scenic designs and costumes. One piece from the collection is a replica of an opera stage from the baroque era. The museum makes use of multimedia 	
appliances and is accessible to wheelchair users.

Impression

See also 
 List of museums in Germany
 List of music museums

References 

Music museums in Germany
Museums in Hamburg
Museums established in 2015
2015 establishments in Germany
Biographical museums in Germany